Shiloh, Ohio may refer to the following places:

Shiloh, Montgomery County, Ohio
Shiloh, Richland County, Ohio